Ryan Breslow is an American entrepreneur. He is the co-founder and executive chairman of Bolt, a one-click checkout technology company; a co-founder of Eco, a digital cryptocurrency platform; a co-founder of Love, a crypto pharmaceutical startup, and the founder of the dance non-profit, The Movement.

Early life and education
Breslow was born and raised in North Miami Beach, Florida, the son of Heather and Eric R. Breslow. In middle school he taught himself to code through online tutorials and YouTube videos.

He attended Dr. Michael M. Krop Senior High School. Throughout high school he was a bag boy at the grocery chain Publix. He also founded an online mattress company and designed and programmed websites for clients including a luxury shopping center and a LeBron James–backed streetwear brand.  He founded two community service projects; the first helped underserved kids who wanted to golf but lacked financial resources and the second benefited homeless veterans in Miami-Dade. A National AP Scholar and  National Merit Award semi-finalist, he graduated from high school first in his class  and received a financial aid scholarship to Stanford.

Career

Bolt
As a computer science student at Stanford, Breslow was interested in digital currency and in his freshman year co-founded a research collective, the Stanford Bitcoin Group. In 2013 he and a classmate began to develop a digital wallet that would allow bitcoin to be used for routine transactions. Shortly after beginning the project, his classmate lost interest and the investor who had promised seed money backed out.

Breslow dropped out of Stanford in 2014.  He continued to live and work out of his dorm room.  In addition to developing the wallet, Breslow and Eric Feldman, a former classmate, spent the following year researching financial regulations, compliance and other issues related to cryptocurrency.  In 2015, partly as a result of their research, their emphasis shifted to one-click checkout technology.  In a 2022 interview with Forbes, Breslow said: “One day it hit me like a bolt of lightning. Amazon has offered one-click checkout since 1999 and the rest of the world doesn’t. The more I learned, the more I realized how big it could be.” He subsequently focused on developing software that would provide one-click purchases for consumers and process transactions for retailers.

The first version of Bolt's online checkout platform was developed in Breslow's dorm room with a team of 10. In 2016, after operating in stealth mode for more than a year, Bolt was officially launched.  Breslow served as the company's CEO. In 2019 it was named to the Forbes "Fintech 50"  and in 2021 Bolt vas placed at #64 on the Inc. 5000. 

With input from the Bolt staff, Breslow developed the Conscious Culture Playbook, an alternative to a traditional employee handbook that brought mindfulness principles together with standards for performance and execution.  In May 2021, conscious.org was launched to make the playbook freely available to other companies and startups.  As part of the company's conscious business culture, Breslow instituted a four-day workweek in January 2022.

In January 2022,  Maju Kuruvilla was named CEO of Bolt and Breslow became the company's executive chairman.  The move followed a controversial series of tweets, in which Breslow described Y Combinator and Stripe as the "mob bosses of Silicon Valley." Breslow maintained that the shift was unrelated to his tweets, stating that it was planned for months to allow him to focus on his “superpowers”: steering Bolt's culture and vision, and deal-making.

As of May 2022, Bolt had 800 employees and was valued at $11 billion. Based on his holdings, Breslow became one of the world's youngest self-made billionaires.

The Movement
Breslow began taking dance classes in San Francisco to diminish the day-to-day stress of running Bolt. Discovering a community among dancers, and believing that dancing would be globally beneficial, he founded The Movement, a non-profit that provides free dance classes to make dance widely accessible.  Initially offered in Miami, it later expanded to New York and Los Angeles.

Recognition
In 2020, Breslow appeared at #1 on the FinTech  list of the Top 10  fintech innovators under 30. He was named an Entrepreneur Of The Year, Northern California in 2021  and a Forbes retail and ecommerce Allstar in 2022.

Bibliography
Fundraising, August 2021.  Independently published.  
Recruiting, December 2021.  Independently published.

References

External links
 ryantakesoff.com 
 Bolt 
conscious.org  
The Movement 

American businesspeople
1994 births
Living people